Chrysoteuchia daisetsuzana is a moth in the family Crambidae. It was described by Shōnen Matsumura in 1927. It is found on the Japanese island of Hokkaido and in Russia.

References

Crambini
Moths described in 1927
Moths of Japan
Moths of Asia